Joe Steven Holt (born 13 October 1997) is a British road and track cyclist from Wales, who currently rides for Tekkerz CC.

Career
At the 2022 British National Track Championships in Newport, Wales he won a British title after winning the team pursuit title. 

He switched to Tekkerz CC from the Wales Racing Academy and in 2023 won two more national titles; he won the Time Trial (or Kilo) and the Scratch, at the 2023 British Cycling National Track Championships .

Major results

2014
 1st  Points classification, Junior Tour of Wales
 UEC European Junior Track Championships
2nd  Team pursuit
3rd  Madison
 2nd Madison (with Alex Dowsett), National Track Championships
2015
 1st  Points classification, Junior Tour of Wales
2016
 1st  Madison (with Ethan Hayter), National Track Championships
 3rd  Team pursuit, UEC European Under-23 Track Championships
2017
 1st  Team pursuit, UEC European Under-23 Track Championships
 National Track Championships
2nd Madison (with Jake Stewart)
2nd Team pursuit
2nd Omnium
2018
 1st  Team pursuit, UEC European Under-23 Track Championships
2022 
 1st  Team pursuit, National Track Championships
2023
 1st  Kilo & Scratch, National Track Championships

References

External links

1997 births
Living people
Welsh male cyclists
Sportspeople from Swansea
Welsh track cyclists
Cyclists at the 2022 Commonwealth Games
Commonwealth Games competitors for Wales